Wyatt Beazley Durrette Jr. (born February 21, 1938) is an American attorney and former politician. He served three terms in the Virginia House of Delegates as a Republican, from 1972 to 1978, and was the party's unsuccessful nominee for governor of Virginia in 1985.

Early and family life
Born in Richmond, Virginia on February 21, 1938, Durrette was raised in Franklin, Virginia, and attended an all-white high school during Massive Resistance. He was captain of the baseball, basketball and football teams, but was kicked off the basketball team for working an afternoon before a game in a clothing store and refusing to follow the coach's order to apologize to his team.

While his father helped build chemical plants for DuPont, Durrette moved to Staunton, Virginia and lived with aunts while attending the Virginia Military Institute. He graduated with a B.S. in Mathematics, but also remembered incurring many demerits for wearing his hair long and failing to shine his shoes. Durrette then attended the Washington and Lee University Law School and founded the school's Conservative Society as well as irregularly published a newspaper called The Southern Conservative. He received his LL.B. degree cum laude, and then planned to teach political science, attending the Johns Hopkins University and receiving a M.A. in political science.

During the Vietnam War, Captain Durrette served in the U.S. Air Force as a lawyer, assigned to California and SEA (1966–68). He later became active in the Veterans of Foreign Wars.

He married Cheryn Durrette and had seven children, living in Fairfax, Virginia after his military service, then moving to the Richmond suburbs in 1985. His son, Wyatt Durrette III would drop out of VMI, but by 2012 became a successful country songwriter. He related that he was raised by strict Southern Baptist parents, later attended a Protestant church, and by 1985 occasionally attended Catholic services with his wife.

Legal career
After admission to the Virginia bar and the end of his military service, Durrette established his private legal practice in Fairfax, Virginia. He became active in the Virginia State, American, Fairfax County and Northern Virginia Jr. Bar Associations, as well as Virginia Trial Lawyers Association. Durrette also became vice president and part owner of American Defense Systems Inc., a Northern Virginia Navy contractor supplying "sophisticated weaponry," and also became vice president of a property management company owning a newly refurbished Richmond hotel. He also was a past director of the Vienna Jaycees and legal counsel to that nonprofit. He also served on the boards of directors of Project Concern, Inc., Northern Virginia chapter of Reading is Fundamental, Inc., and the Northern Virginia Association for Retarded Children, as well as on the advisory committee of the State office on Volunteerism.

During his run for statewide office in 1985, as described below, Durrette moved to Richmond, where , he works on complex litigation for Durrette Crump PLC.

Political career
Fairfax County voters elected Durrette to represent them (part time) in 1971, the first year in which Fairfax was divided into separate house districts (rather than a six-member district). He was re-elected twice, serving from 1972 until 1977.

Durrette ran for Attorney General twice, losing the Republican nomination in 1977 to Marshall Coleman and the general election in 1981 to Gerald Baliles. He challenged Baliles in 1985 for the Governorship but was unsuccessful and subsequently retired from politics.

References

External links
 

1938 births
20th-century American lawyers
20th-century American politicians
21st-century American lawyers
Candidates in the 1985 United States elections
Johns Hopkins University alumni
Lawyers from Richmond, Virginia
Living people
Republican Party members of the Virginia House of Delegates
Military personnel from Virginia
People from Franklin, Virginia
Politicians from Fairfax, Virginia
United States Air Force personnel of the Vietnam War
Virginia Military Institute alumni
Virginia lawyers
Washington and Lee University School of Law alumni